Fuerza Bruta is a postmodern theatre show that premiered in Buenos Aires in 2005 and was created by Diqui James. It is also the name of the company that brings the show. Members of the company that created Fuerza Bruta were co-creators of a previous company called De La Guarda, which presented a similar show named Villa Villa. It is a very energetic spectacle under the motto Brute Force, features interaction between the performers and the public, and is described as a 360 degree experience.

The show opened Off-Broadway in New York City at the Daryl Roth Theater in 2007 and closed August 28, 2016. 

The show has since travelled over the world. It has been performed in Buenos Aires, Seoul, Cordoba, Bogota, Queretaro, Miami, Chicago, Lisbon, Bilbao, Berlin, Moscow, Shanghai, London, Edinburgh, Antwerp, Lima, Taipei, Macau and Madrid and is scheduled for Istanbul, Tel Aviv, Manila, Las Vegas, Tokyo, Limerick and Heerlen.

Direction and production
 Diqui James
 Gaby Kerpel
 Fabio Dáquila
 Alejandro García
 Agustina James
 Lincoln Juán Morallez

Noted castmembers
 R&B musician Usher performed in Fuerza Bruta as part of the promotion for his 2012 album Looking 4 Myself.
 Daniel "Cloud" Campos
 Kpop boy group Super Junior member Eunhyuk
H.O.T member Jang Woo-hyuk

Filmography 
The show/company acts in a sequence of the film Tesis sobre un homicidio (H. Goldfrid, 2013).

References

External links
 
 Broadway show

Theatre in Argentina
Postmodern plays
Postmodern theatre
2005 plays